Hall Render is an American health care-focused law firm. The firm concentrates on health law and other areas in the health care industry, serving health systems, hospitals, physician organizations, post-acute and ancillary providers, ambulatory surgery centers, provider-sponsored health plans, and other health care industry partners.

Hall Render was founded in 1967 in Indianapolis and most recently opened its 10th office in Annapolis, Maryland.

History 
William S. Hall started Hall Render in 1967 as general counsel to the Indiana Hospital Association. The firm has continued to focus on health care law, becoming Hall, Render, Killian, Heath & Lyman in 1984 and gradually expanding to 9 offices across the United States.

Hall Render now has 150 attorneys serving health care industry clients.

Services
Hall Render attorneys provides services in the health care industry in the following areas:

 health care law
 health care reform
 regulatory issues
 joint ventures
 ethical and religious directives
 health information systems
 compliance
 accountable care organizations
 licensing
 tax
 antitrust
 managed care
 Medicare and Medicaid reimbursement
 medical staff relations
 tax-exempt financing
 patient care
 HIPAA
 real estate and construction
 labor and employment

Office Locations 
Hall Render has offices in Anchorage, Dallas, Denver, Detroit, Indianapolis, Milwaukee, Raleigh, Seattle and Washington, DC.

Rankings and Awards  
In November 2016, Hall Render was named in U.S. News & World Report and Best Lawyers® 2017's "Best Law Firms" rankings. The firm received a national first-tier ranking in health care law and metropolitan first-tier rankings in health care law in Colorado, Indianapolis, Milwaukee, and Troy, as well as construction law in Louisville. Hall Render attorneys are annually selected by their peers for inclusion in Best Lawyers' The Best Lawyers in America listing and included in Super Lawyers listings in several markets across the nation.

In June 2016, Modern Healthcare named Hall Render as the second largest health care law firm in the country. The publication is known for providing the industry with competitive rankings and practical information for all areas of the health care industry. In its June 27/July 4, 2016 issue, the rankings were released and reflect results based on the number of attorneys spending at least 50 percent of their time on health law.

Hall Render has also been recognized as an advocate of diversity in the legal field, being named on Law360's list of best firms for female attorneys.

Leadership 
The president and CEO is Gregg Wallander, and each office has a managing partner with connections in the regional health care community. William H. Thompson currently serves as the board chairman, and was a former president of the firm as well as a former student of firm founder, John Render. Chairman of the Firm Bill Thompson received the Distinguished Alumni Award from the Indiana University Richard M. Fairbanks School of Public Health Alumni Association in 2015. The firm values honesty, mutual respect and the uncompromised personal integrity of its employees. The attorneys in the Denver office work with clients on health care, employment and antitrust matters.

References

Health law in the United States
Law firms established in 1967
1967 establishments in Indiana
Law firms based in Indiana